University House is a 19th-century building in Auckland, New Zealand, that originally served as the synagogue for the city's Jewish population. The building is situated on Princes Street, adjacent to Albert Park, and is now occupied by the University of Auckland.

History
A Jewish community had been present in Auckland since its founding in 1840. The synagogue building was designed and built by Edward Bartley in 1884–1885 in a Romanesque style, incorporating Gothic and Moorish design elements. The foundation stone was laid by David Nathan (1816–1886), an early Jewish settler and founder of the L.D. Nathan chain of stores, and the synagogue opened on 9 November 1885. The building could seat 375 people. It was built on the site of an earlier military guardhouse associated with Albert Barracks. In 1967 the congregation moved to larger premises on Greys Avenue, overlooking Myers Park, and the Princes Street synagogue was deconsecrated in 1969. The construction of the synagogue was a statement by the Jewish community in Auckland of not only status, but of their acceptance in the local community.

In 1967, the congregation moved to a new premises on Greys Avenue. Ownership of the property reverted to Auckland City Council as part of the Albert Park Reserve following the deconsecration. The building was left vacant and deteriorated over the next two decades, until it was carefully restored under the direction of Salmond Reed Architects in 1989 to serve as a branch of the National Bank. The University of Auckland has leased it since 2003, and it now houses the University's Alumni Relations and Development department (formerly called External Relations).

The building has a Category I listing with the New Zealand Historic Places Trust.

References

1880s architecture in New Zealand
Auckland CBD
Buildings and structures of the University of Auckland
Heritage New Zealand Category 1 historic places in the Auckland Region
Former religious buildings and structures in New Zealand
Former synagogues
Moorish Revival synagogues
Neoclassical synagogues
Religious buildings and structures in Auckland
Romanesque architecture in New Zealand
Synagogues completed in 1885
Synagogues in New Zealand